Hoy Phallin ( born 30 March 1996) is a Cambodian footballer who plays as a midfielder for ISI Dangkor Senchey.

International career
He made his senior international debut at the age of 17 on 22 March 2013 in a 2014 AFC Challenge Cup qualification match against Turkmenistan.

Honours

Club
Svay Rieng
Cambodian League: 2013 2019 
Hun Sen Cup: 2015 2017

References

External links
 

1996 births
Living people
Cambodian footballers
Cambodia international footballers
Association football midfielders
Preah Khan Reach Svay Rieng FC players
Sportspeople from Phnom Penh
Competitors at the 2017 Southeast Asian Games
Southeast Asian Games competitors for Cambodia